Laukvik or Laukvika may refer to:

Places
Laukvik, Aust-Agder, a village in Risør municipality in Aust-Agder county, Norway
Laukvik, Finnmark, a village in Alta municipality in Finnmark county, Norway
Laukvik, Nordland, a village in Vågan municipality in Nordland county, Norway
Laukvik, Tjeldsund, a village in Tjeldsund municipality in Nordland county, Norway
Laukvik, Troms, a village in Lenvik municipality in Troms county, Norway